Peterson Farm or Peterson Farmstead may refer to:

 Brugjeld-Peterson Family Farmstead District, Wallingford, Iowa, listed on the NRHP in Iowa
 Andrew Peterson Farmstead, Waconia, Minnesota
 Peter Peterson Farmstead, Waverly, Nebraska, listed on the NRHP in Nebraska
 John N. Peterson Farm, Poplar, North Carolina

See also
Peterson House (disambiguation)